Nausitz is a village and a former municipality in the district Kyffhäuserkreis, in Thuringia, Germany. Since 1 January 2019, it is part of the town Roßleben-Wiehe.

References

Former municipalities in Thuringia
Kyffhäuserkreis